The Fleet of Courland and Semigallia was the navy and merchant fleet of the Duchy of Courland and Semigallia. It has existed since the end of the 16th century, but the official date of its creation is considered to be the founding of the Vindava Admiralty in 1638. The main creator was Duke Jacob Kettler, the most prominent of all the rulers of the duchy. It was built at the Vindava (1638–1718), Goldingen (1638–1702), and Libava shipyards (1677–1702). During its heyday in the middle of the 17th century, it numbered up to 40 warships and 100 merchant ships. The fleet was used in international trade, the Couronian colonization of America and Africa, and the wars of European powers as a mercenary force. It suffered greatly in the wars with the Swedes: the Second Northern War (1655–1660) and the Great Northern War (1700–1721). In fact, it ceased to exist after the closure of the shipyard in Vindava.

History

Creation 
The founding date of the fleet of Courland and Semigallia is considered to be 1638, when Duke Friedrich Kettler, at the initiative of Crown Prince James, built the Vindava Admiralty. Shipyards were also built in Vindava and Goldingen: large ships, including military ones, were built at the former; at the latter, small ships were built.

Until this time, from the end of the 16th century, Goldingen was the main area for ship-building. Merchant ships were primarily produced.

Ship-building work lasted a long time due to the small number of experts. During the year, the people of Courland built one large ship and two small ships. As of 1640, the duchy's fleet remained insignificant, and its armament was worse than average.

The heyday 

The heyday of the Courland fleet came during the reign of Duke Jacob Kettler. He hired specialists from the Netherlands to modernize the Vindava and Goldingen shipyards. The Dutch masters who built the ships, and local Germans and Latvians worked as apprentices and helpers. Thanks to the reforms, each shipyard produced five large ships a year. In 1677, Jacob opened a third shipyard in Libava, where many merchants were concentrated.

The duke also created the infrastructure of the fleet: he built many piers, berths and warehouses. He widened Vindava Harbor and deepened its bottom, making Vindava the main external port of the duchy, one of the largest trading centers on the Baltic Sea. In parallel, the duke established manufactories for the needs of the fleet: seventeen iron (local marsh ore), eleven anchor, twelve nail, ten cannon, ten rifle, two steel, seven metal, eight copper smelting (imported, African), three canvas rope, five powder, twenty-nine sawmills and woodworking, and dozens of tar booths.

By the end of the 1650s, Courland and Semigallia had more than 40 warships armed with 15–72 guns, as well as about 80 merchant ships, mostly . The navy was commanded by the Dutch Admiral Imke, and the merchant Heinrich Mober. Warships were used to protect the merchant navy from pirates – to protect the Courland colonies in Tobago and at the mouth of the Gambia. The entire fleet was headed by the Vindava Admiralty.

The Second Northern War with the Swedes of 1658–1660 dealt a great blow to the fleet of Courland and Semigallia. Betrayed by his hopes for neutrality, Jacob was invaded by the Swedes and taken prisoner with his family. The attackers burned the Courland shipyards and manufactories, killed many craftsmen, and took some of the ships and specialists to Sweden. After the Peace of Oliva, Jacob regained the duchy and tried to revive the country's economy, but did not reach the pace of pre-war production.

During his reign, Duke James built 65 warships and 130 merchant ships, which was incredible for that time, especially for such a small state. The duke sometimes rented ships. Thus, in 1648, the government of the Venetian Republic was indebted to Jacob for using the services of Courland ships.

Decline 
The decline of the fleet of Courland and Semigallia began with the reign of Frederick Casimir, son of Jacob. The generous duke led a lavish lifestyle, was interested in entertainment rather than ships, and therefore sold most of the state-owned manufactories founded by his father for cash. He stopped the production of warships at shipyards, sold large ships, and sold the colonies to the British.

Before the Great Northern War, the duchy had only 15 ships.

In 1702 the Goldingen and Libava shipyards were closed, and in 1718 the Vindava shipyards suffered the same fate.

Ships 
In times of illiteracy—among both commanders and sailors—instead of the name of the ship on board, a coat of arms or other image was placed on the stern. Sometimes it was supplemented by a signature, usually Latin. It could be the name or motto of the vessel. Accordingly, the same ship could be mentioned differently in the documentation.

List 
 in parentheses, the number of guns.

  (72);
  (42);
  (40);
  (36);
  (40);
  (24);
  (54);
  (28);
  (32);
  (28);
  (28);
  (30);
  (30);
  (60);
  (40);
  (46);
  (44);
  (40);
  (46)
  (36);
  (40);
  (34);
  (28);
  (28);
  (24);
  (24);
  (32);
  (24);
  (40);
  (24);
  (24);
  (24);
  (20);
  (20);
  (20);
  (34);
  (32);
  (24);
  (24);
  (24);
  (20);
  (24);
  (30);
  (32).

 Before the Great Northern War:
 (length – 41 m, armament – 50 large and 20 small guns; in 1702 captured by the Swedes, sunk in 1712).
  (frigate, tonnage – 1000 tons; shipyard – Libava, 1678). 
  (frigate, length – 40 m; shipyard – Vindava, 1694) 
  (frigate, shipyard – Libava, 1678).
  (built in 1687 for the Tobago expedition) 
  (convoy ship in 1696–1699; shipyard – Libava, 1680) 
  (convoy ship from 1680) 
  (merchant ship; convoy since 1689) 
  (merchant ship; convoy since 1688) 
  (merchant ship built in 1680) 
  (merchant ship, 1691) 
  (merchant ship) 
  (merchant ship) 
  (merchant ship) 
  (ducal yacht, 1690)

References

Courland
Navies